The range of area codes 700–799 in Mexico is reserved for the states of Guerrero, Mexico, Michoacán, Hidalgo, Morelos, Oaxaca, Puebla, Tlaxcala and Veracruz.

(For other areas, see Area codes in Mexico by code).

7